The Inspector General of the , is the highest-ranking military position held by a commissioned officer on active duty in the , the present-day armed forces of Germany.

Title and translations 
While official translations of the position is "Chief of Defence", the German term "" – "Inspector General" – was specifically created to avoid the term of "" ("Chief of General Staff") deemed historically compromised. Therefore, the  has no "General Staff", but the "Army Command" ("").

List of officeholders

See also 
 Inspector of the Army
 Inspector of the Navy
 Inspector of the Air Force

References

External links 
 List of Chiefs of Staff, Bundeswehr with personal data and photo (Official website of the Bundeswehr)

 
Germany
German military personnel of the Bundeswehr